East Fraserville is a rural community in Cumberland County, Nova Scotia.

Notes

References
https://web.archive.org/web/20100205051327/http://the506.com/roads/NS/209.html

Communities in Cumberland County, Nova Scotia